Tomás Garicano (1910–1988) was a Spanish military lawyer, governor and politician, who served as interior minister in Francoist Spain. Following the civil war he supported the repression of those who had opposed the Nationalist forces.

Early life and education
Garicano was born in Pamplona, Navarre, on 9 February 1910. His family were of Navarrese and Gipuzkoan descent. He studied law in Zaragoza and Madrid and graduated in 1929.

Career
Garicano was a military lawyer. He served as governor of Barcelona for nearly thirteen years until 1969. He was appointed minister of interior on 29 October 1969, succeeding Camilo Alonso Vega in the post when he left office due to mandatory age limit. Garicano's tenure lasted until May 1973 when he resigned from the post. He was replaced by Carlos Arias Navarro as interior minister.

Personal life and death
Garicano married María Rojas Gestosos with whom he had six children. He was the grand uncle of LSE economist and politician of Ciudadanos Luis Garicano.

Garicano died in Madrid of cardiac arrest on 16 January 1988.

References

External links

20th-century Spanish lawyers
1910 births
1988 deaths
Civil governors of Barcelona
FET y de las JONS politicians
Government ministers during the Francoist dictatorship
Interior ministers of Spain
People from Pamplona
Politicians from Navarre